Facundo Rodríguez may refer to:

 Facundo Rodríguez (footballer, born 1995), Uruguayan forward
 Facundo Rodríguez (footballer, born 2000), Argentine defender